Alender is a surname. Notable people with the surname include:

Urmas Alender (1953–1994), Estonian singer and musician
Yoko Alender (born 1979), Estonian architect, civil servant and politician